Sulcus (plural sulci) may refer to:

 Gingival sulcus, the space between a tooth and surrounding tissue
 Sulcus (morphology), a groove, crevice or furrow in medicine, botany, and zoology 
 Sulcus (neuroanatomy), a crevice on the surface of the brain
 Sulcus (geology), a long parallel groove on a planet or a moon
 Coronal sulcus, the groove under the corona of the glans penis
 In botany, sulci in seeds or pollen grains are colpi

See also
 Sulci, an ancient town in southwest Sardinia notable for the Battle of Sulci in 258 BC
 Sulcalization, a term in phonetics and phonology
 Gyrification